Dorothy Round defeated Jadwiga Jędrzejowska in the final, 6–2, 2–6, 7–5 to win the ladies' singles tennis title at the 1937 Wimbledon Championships. Helen Jacobs was the defending champion, but lost in the quarterfinals to Round.

Seeds

  Helen Jacobs (quarterfinals)
  Hilde Sperling (quarterfinals)
  Anita Lizana (quarterfinals)
  Jadwiga Jędrzejowska (final)
  Alice Marble (semifinals)
  Simonne Mathieu (semifinals)
  Dorothy Round (champion)
  Kay Stammers (fourth round)

Draw

Finals

Top half

Section 1

Section 2

Section 3

Section 4

Bottom half

Section 5

Section 6

Section 7

Section 8

References

External links

Women's Singles
Wimbledon Championship by year – Women's singles
Wimbledon Championships - singles
Wimbledon Championships - singles